Graham Sherwood Peck (15 May 1930 – 28 July 2015) was an Australian rules footballer who played with Hawthorn and St Kilda in the Victorian Football League (VFL).

Peck played VFL football while completing his medical studies at the University of Melbourne and he later served as President and club doctor for the Old Melburnians Football Club in the Victorian Amateur Football Association (VAFA).

Notes

External links 

1930 births
Australian rules footballers from Victoria (Australia)
Hawthorn Football Club players
St Kilda Football Club players
2015 deaths